George Hobart may refer to:

 George Hobart, 3rd Earl of Buckinghamshire (1731–1804), British peer
 George S. Hobart (1875–1938), American politician in New Jersey
 George V. Hobart (1867-1926) Canadian-American playwright and humorist